Bulbostylis haitiensis is a species of plant in the family Cyperaceae first described by Georg Kükenthal. No subspecies are listed in the Catalogue of Life.

References

haitiensis